Alexander Hunter  (born 1862) was a Welsh international footballer. He was part of the Wales national football team, playing 1 match on 12 March 1887 against Ireland.

See also
 List of Wales international footballers (alphabetical)
 List of Wales international footballers born outside Wales

References

1862 births
Welsh footballers
Wales international footballers
Place of birth missing
Date of death missing
Association footballers not categorized by position